The Order of the Military Cross is a Polish order established on October 18, 2006. It is awarded for "distinguished service, sacrifice, and courage in actions against terrorism in the country or during foreign deployments of the Armed Forces of the Republic of Poland in times of peace."

Classes 
The Order has three classes:
  Grand Cross (Krzyż Wielki)
  Commander's Cross (Krzyż Komandorski)
  Knight's Cross (Krzyż Kawalerski)

Notable recipients 
 gen. broni Bronisław Kwiatkowski
 gen. dyw. Tadeusz Buk

See also
Military Cross (Poland)

Military awards and decorations of Poland
Awards established in 2006